Odontomyia hoodiana is a species of soldier fly in the family Stratiomyidae.

Distribution
Canada, United States, Mexico.

References

Stratiomyidae
Insects described in 1887
Diptera of North America
Taxa named by Jacques-Marie-Frangile Bigot